A correspondent or on-the-scene reporter is usually a journalist or commentator for a magazine, or an agent who contributes reports to a newspaper, or radio or television news, or another type of company, from a remote, often distant, location. A foreign correspondent is stationed in a foreign country. The term "correspondent" refers to the original practice of filing news reports via postal letter. The largest networks of correspondents belong to ARD (Germany) and BBC (UK).

Vs. reporter

In Britain, the term 'correspondent' usually refers to someone with a specific specialist area, such as health correspondent. A 'reporter' is usually someone without such expertise who is allocated stories by the newsdesk on any story in the news. A 'correspondent' can sometimes have direct executive powers, for example a 'Local Correspondent' (voluntary) of the Open Spaces Society  (founded 1865) has some delegated powers to speak for the Society on path and commons matters in their area including representing the Society at Public Inquiries.

Common types of correspondents

Capitol correspondent
A capitol correspondent is a correspondent who reports from headquarters of government.

Legal/justice correspondent
A legal or justice correspondent reports on issues involving legal or criminal justice topics, and may often report from the vicinity of a courthouse.

Red carpet correspondent
A red carpet correspondent is an entertainment reporter who reports from the red carpet of an entertainment or media event, such as a premiere, award ceremony or festival.

Foreign correspondent
A foreign correspondent is any individual who reports from primarily foreign locations.

War correspondent

A war correspondent is a foreign correspondent who covers stories first-hand from a war zone.

Foreign bureau
A foreign bureau is a news bureau set up to support a news gathering operation in a foreign country.

On-the-scene TV news

In TV news, a "live on-the-scene" reporter reports from the field during a "live shot". This has become an extremely popular format with the advent of Eyewitness News.

A recent cost-saving measure is for local TV news to dispense with out-of-town reporters and replace them with syndicated correspondents, usually supplied by a centralized news reporting agency. The producers of the show schedule time with the correspondent, who then appears "live" to file a report and chat with the hosts. The reporter will go and do a number of similar reports for other stations. Many viewers may be unaware that the reporter does not work directly for the news show. This is also a popular way to report the weather. For example, AccuWeather doesn't just supply data, they also supply on-air meteorologists from television studios at their headquarters.

See also
From Our Own Correspondent
Bosco Kaka
Letter from America
List of foreign correspondents in the Spanish Civil War
Parachute journalism
People's correspondent
Press pool
Reporters Without Borders
Stringer (journalism)

References

External links 

Journalism occupations
Journalism
 

he:כתב (מקצוע)#כתב שטח